Gibberula turgidula is a species of very small sea snail, a marine gastropod mollusk or micromollusk in the family Cystiscidae.

Description

Distribution
This species occurs in the Mediterrean Sea off Sicily.

References

 Monterosato, A. T., 1878. Enumerazione e sinonomia delle conchiglie mediterranee. Giornale di Scienze Naturali ed Economiche 13: 61-115
 Gofas, S., 1990. Le genre Gibberula (Marginellidae) en Méditerranée. Lavori della Società Italiana di Malacologia 23: 113-139

External links
 MNHN, Pris: lectotype
  Pallary, P. (1900). Coquilles marines du littoral du département d'Oran. Journal de Conchyliologie. 48(3): 211-422
  Gofas, S.; Le Renard, J.; Bouchet, P. (2001). Mollusca. in: Costello, M.J. et al. (eds), European Register of Marine Species: a check-list of the marine species in Europe and a bibliography of guides to their identification. Patrimoines Naturels. 50: 180-213.

turgidula
Gastropods described in 1900